The Gerindra Party (acronym for) is a right-wing populist political party in Indonesia. Formed in 2008, Gerindra serves as the political vehicle of former general Prabowo Subianto. It is presently the third-largest party in the House of Representatives, where it has 78 seats. Gerindra had positioned itself as an opposition party, but in 2019 it joined President Joko Widodo's Onward Indonesia Cabinet, despite Prabowo having run against Widodo in Indonesia's 2014 and 2019 presidential elections.

History
After coming last in Golkar's presidential convention on 21 April 2004, Prabowo served as a member of Golkar's Advisory Board until his resignation on 12 July 2008. Gerindra was formed on 6 February 2008 at the suggestion of Prabowo's younger brother, Hashim Djojohadikusumo, who helped pay for party's prime-time TV advertising campaign. Prabowo was appointed chairman of the party's Founding Board.

Gerindra's provincial level election teams were formed in February 2009. The party then claimed a membership of approximately 15 million, with its support base coming from across Java, Sumatra, Kalimantan and Sulawesi.

The party won 4.5% of the vote in the 2009 legislative election, and was awarded 26 seats in the People's Representative Council.

The Reform Star Party (PBR) was merged into Gerindra in February 2011.

In the national legislative election on 9 April 2014, the party's vote share jumped to 11.8%, making it the third-most popular party in Indonesia. Gerindra almost trebled the number of seats it won from 26 seats in 2009 to 73 seats in 2014.

Following the death of Gerindra chairman Suhardi on 28 August 2014, Prabowo was appointed general chairman on 20 September 2014.

Policies
Gerindra follows a populist and nationalist economic platform, targeting the lower middle class such as farmers and fishers, though its supporters in the 2014 general election were disproportionately urban dwellers.

In November 2019, Gerindra deputy chairman Fadli Zon said the party firmly rejects lesbian, gay, bisexual and transgender (LGBT) people. Gerindra's Twitter account said the party supports early efforts to prevent LGBT in the community and schools, by involving religious leaders and health experts.

Wing organizations
Gerindra's wing organizations include:
 TIDAR (Tunas Indonesia Raya, Great Indonesia Bud)
 PIRA (Perempuan Indonesia Raya, Great Indonesia Woman)
 GEMIRA (Gerakan Muslim Indonesia Raya, Great Indonesia Muslim Movement)
 GEKIRA (Gerakan Kristiani Indonesia Raya, Great Indonesia Christian Movement); formerly named KIRA (Kristen Indonesia Raya, Great Indonesia Christians).
 GEMA SADHANA (Gerakan Masyarakat Sanathana Dharma Nusantara, Sanathana Dharma Nusantara Society Movement); for Hindus and Buddhists.
 PETIR (Persatuan Tionghoa Indonesia Raya, Great Indonesia Chinese Association)

Election results

Legislative election results

Presidential election results

Note: Bold text suggests the party's member, or a former member who was still active in the party by the time of his nomination.

References

2008 establishments in Indonesia
Anti-communist parties
Anti-communism in Indonesia
Conservative parties in Indonesia
Nationalist parties in Asia
Pancasila political parties
Political parties established in 2008
Political parties in Indonesia
Organizations that oppose LGBT rights
Right-wing politics in Indonesia
Right-wing populism in Indonesia
Right-wing populist parties
Social conservative parties